Brian Rhodes (7 March 1951 – 28 June 2019) was an Australian cricketer. He played one first-class match for New South Wales in 1971/72.

See also
 List of New South Wales representative cricketers

References

External links
 

1951 births
2019 deaths
Australian cricketers
New South Wales cricketers
Cricketers from Sydney